Seeing Again (Spanish: Volver a ver) is a 2018 Peruvian documentary film written and directed by Judith Vélez. It was released in commercial theaters on November 7, 2018. The film was selected as the Peruvian representative to compete in the Best Ibero-American Film category at the 35th Goya Awards, but was not nominated.

Synopsis 
The documentary that narrates the return of photojournalists Vera Lentz, Óscar Medrano and Alejandro Balaguer to Ayacucho, a region that was severely punished in the 1980s during the years of the internal armed conflict in Peru, and their reunion with the people they portrayed.

Awards

References

External links 

 

2018 films
2018 documentary films
Peruvian documentary films
2010s Peruvian films
2010s Spanish-language films
Films about terrorism
Films about photojournalists
Films about photography